Sint Maartensbrug is a village in the Dutch province of North Holland. It is a part of the municipality of Schagen, and lies about 14 km northwest of Heerhugowaard.

History 
The village was first mentioned in 1613 as "Sinte Maertensbrugge", and means "bridge (over the Groote Sloot on the road to) Sint Maarten". Sint Maartensbrug is a cross shaped village which appeared shortly after the area was poldered between 1596 and 1597. It consists of a linear settlement along the Groote Sloot and another linear settlement along the road.

The Dutch Reformed church is a wide aisleless church with wooden tower which was built in 1696. The polder mill N-G or Noorder G was probably built in the second half of the 17th century. It was in service until 1958 when it was replaced by a Diesel powered pumping station. Between 1969 and 1972, the windmill was restored and is frequently in service on a voluntary basis.

Gallery

See also
 Sint Maartensvlotbrug

References

Schagen
Populated places in North Holland